Summerland may refer to:

Film and television
 Summerland (2010 film), an Icelandic film
 Summerland (2020 film), a British film
 Summerland (TV series), a 2004–2005 American drama series

Literature
 Summerland (novel), a 2002 novel by Michael Chabon
 Summerland, a 2018 novel by Hannu Rajaniemi

Music
 Summerland (album), by the Herd, 2008
 Summerland, an album by Coleman Hell, 2016
 "Summerland", a song by Everclear from Sparkle and Fade, 1995
 "Summerland", a song by Florida Georgia Line from Dig Your Roots, 2016
 "Summerland", a song by King's X from Gretchen Goes to Nebraska, 1989
 Summerland, the second part of the 1935 piano suite Three Visions by William Grant Still
 Summerland Tour, an annual music festival founded by Art Alexakis of Everclear
 "Summerland", a song by half•alive from Conditions Of A Punk, 2022

Places
Australia
 Summerland Peninsula, a peninsula on Phillip Island, Victoria
 Summerlands, Victoria, a former residential subdivision on Summerland Peninsula
 Summerland Way, a state route in New South Wales

Canada
 Summerland, British Columbia

United Kingdom
 Summerlands, Cumbria, England

United States
 Summerland, California, an unincorporated community
 Summerland Oil Field, an inactive offshore oil field
 Summerland Key, an island and unincorporated community in the Florida Keys

Sports
 Summerland Australian Football League, a 1984–2011 Australian rules football competition in New South Wales
 Summerland Buckaroos, later Kelowna Buckaroos, a defunct junior ice hockey team in Kelowna, British Columbia, Canada
 Summerland Steam, a junior ice hockey team in Summerland, British Columbia
 Summerland Sting, a defunct junior ice hockey team in Summerland, British Columbia

Other uses
 Summerland disaster, a 1973 fire in an entertainment complex on the Isle of Man
 Summerland Secondary School, Summerland, British Columbia, Canada
 The Summerland, the afterlife in several religions